Barney's Junction is a census-designated place in Ferry County, Washington, in the United States.

Demographics
In 2010, it had a population of 146. 44 are male. 102 are female.

Geography
Barney's Junction is located in eastern Ferry County at coordinates 48°37′24″N 118°07′34″W, on the west side of the Columbia River. U.S. Route 395 crosses the river at the north end of the CDP, leading east  to Kettle Falls in Stevens County. To the north US 395 leads  to the Canadian border at Laurier. Washington State Route 20 intersects US 395 at Barney's Junction, and leads generally west  over Sherman Creek Pass in Colville National Forest to Republic, the Ferry County seat.

References

Census-designated places in Ferry County, Washington